The 2018 Men's League1 Ontario season was the fifth season of play for League1 Ontario, a Division 3 men's soccer league in the Canadian soccer pyramid and the highest level of soccer based in the Canadian province of Ontario.

Vaughan Azzurri won the league championship and earned entry into the 2019 Canadian Championship; the top national tournament for men's soccer teams. Vaughan captured the league double for a second time by also winning the L1 Cup, a feat they first achieved in 2016. FC London finished the season with the best regular season record, earning 38 points in 16 games.

Changes from 2017 
The men's division grew slightly to 17 teams for this season, with the addition of Darby FC, Unionville Milliken SC, and Alliance United FC (a joint partnership between Markham SC and Wexford SC).  Durham United FA and North Toronto Nitros did not return for this season.

During the off-season, Jim Brennan stepped down as head of Aurora FC to accept a position with York 9 FC in the Canadian Premier League.  FC London also announced the affiliation of its youth academy with professional side Toronto FC.

This season saw expanded playoffs and a return to single-table competition for the men's division.  The top eight teams overall from the men's division entered the playoffs, which consisted of a group stage and a final championship match between the winner of each group.  The women's side saw a shorter season which ended in August, followed by a four-team elimination playoff for the league title.

Teams

Regular season 
Each team played 16 matches as part of the season; one match against all other teams.  The top eight teams competed in the league playoffs at the end of the season, the winner of which earned entry into the 2019 Canadian Championship.

Playoffs 
The top eight teams from the regular season were divided into two groups of four for the playoffs.  Each team played three matches; one match against all other teams in their group.  The top team from each group advanced to the league championship, the winner of which earned entry into the 2019 Canadian Championship.

Group stage 
Group A

Group B

League Championship 
The league champion was determined by a single match between the two group winners in the first round of the playoffs. The winner qualified for the 2019 Canadian Championship.

Cup 
The cup tournament is a separate contest from the rest of the season, in which all 17 teams from the men's division took part.  It is not a form of playoffs at the end of the season (as is typically seen in North American sports), but is more like the EFL Cup, albeit only for League1 Ontario teams.  All matches are separate from the regular season, and are not reflected in the season standings.

The cup tournament for the men's division is a single-match knockout tournament with a total of four rounds culminating in a final match in the start of August, with initial matches determined by random draw.  Each match in the tournament must return a result; any match drawn after 90 minutes advanced directly to kicks from the penalty mark instead of extra time.

Preliminary round

First round

Quarterfinals

Semifinals

Final

Statistics

Top goalscorers 

Updated to matches played on August 18, 2018.  Source:

Top goalkeepers 

Updated to matches played on August 18, 2018.  Minimum 270 minutes played.  Source:

Awards 
The following players received honours in the 2018 season:

 First Team All-Stars

 Second Team All-Stars

 Third Team All-Stars

All-Star Game 
The league announced that an All-Star Game between League1 Ontario and the Première Ligue de soccer du Québec (PLSQ) would once again take place this season. The game was hosted by the PLSQ and was played on June 30.

References

External links 

League1
League1 Ontario seasons